Mutual combat, a term commonly used in United States courts, occurs when two individuals intentionally and consensually engage in a fair fight, while not hurting bystanders or damaging property. There have been numerous cases where this concept was successfully used in defense of the accused. In some cases, mutual combat may nevertheless result in killings.

Notable examples
In 2012, MMA fighter Phoenix Jones hit the headlines for engaging in mutual combat. A video of the fight went viral. The Seattle Police Department later defended their officers for not intervening. The Seattle Municipal Code 12A.06.025 states that "It is unlawful for any person to intentionally fight with another person in a public place and thereby create a substantial risk of: 1. Injury to a person who is not actively participating in the fight; or 2. Damage to the property of a person who is not actively participating in the fight." Thus since the fight did not injure a third party or damage property nor have a substantial risk to do so, it was allowed by this law.

Also in 2012, Gabriel Aubry and Olivier Martinez engaged in mutual combat and were not charged. In 2014, after Zac Efron had engaged in a fight in Skid Row, law enforcement officials did not make any arrests because they viewed it as mutual combat. Mutual combat has been used to deny damage claims, as a legal defense, and to drop charges against fighting students.

Oregon law 
Oregon law specifically bans mutual combat, according to subsection three of ORS 161.215: "a person is not justified in using physical force upon another person if: the physical force involved is the product of a combat by agreement not specifically authorized by law."

See also

 Duel

 Street fighting

References

External links
 Supreme Court of Georgia about manslaughter involving mutual combat
Combat
Legal terminology
Street culture
Violence